Constantinople is a Montreal-based early music and middle eastern music ensemble. The group was formed in 1988 by brothers Kiya Tabassian (setar) and Ziya Tabassian (tombak). The sétar and tombak are complemented by viola da gamba, renaissance cornett, and daf.

Discography
Musique du Moyen Âge et de la Renaissance – instrumental  (Atma 22269)
Memoria Sefardí – Musique d'Espagne juive et chrétienne (no texts) (Atma 22274)
Li Tans Nouveaus – troubadours Châtelain de Coucy, Li nouviauz tanz et mais et violete. (texts) Anne Azéma (Atma)
De Castille à Samarkand (no texts) with Guy Ross (Atma 22383)
Greece - Carrefour De La Méditerrannée (texts)	with ensemble En Chordais (Atma) Atma Classique ACD 22314
Que le Yable les emporte – traditional songs of Quebec (texts) with Bernard Simard  Atma Classique, ACD 22316
Terres Turquoises, La princessa y el caballero (texts in Spanish and one in Arabic) Françoise Atlan
Mania - instrumental music Tabassian brothers Atma Classique, ACD 22340
Terra nostra - 17th century Mexico (Spanish texts) José Ángel Guttiérrez, Teresita de Jesús Islas (Atma 22567)
Ay Amor – songs in French based on Codax etc. (texts) with Francoise Atlan (Atma) Atma Classique ACD 22594
Premiers Songes - on poems of Sor Juana Inés de la Cruz Analekta AN 2 9989
Metamorfosi - Italian baroque
Marco Polo -En Chordais and Constantinople World Village - Harmonia Mundi
Jardins migrateurs - an encounter between Mandingo and Persian music Analekta 2 9142

References

Early music groups